Küküllő County was a county of the Kingdom of Hungary. Located in the Transylvania region between the rivers Maros (Mureș) and Nagy-Küküllő (Târnava Mare), it existed from the 11th century until 1876, when it was split off into Kis-Küküllő County and Nagy-Küküllő County. Its capital was Küküllővár.

Notes

Counties in the Kingdom of Hungary
Kingdom of Hungary counties in Transylvania
States and territories established in the 11th century
States and territories disestablished in 1876